Andrew Peebles (born 9 January 1989) is a Zimbabwean rower. He placed 25th in the men's single sculls event at the 2016 Summer Olympics.

References

External links

1989 births
Living people
Zimbabwean male rowers
Olympic rowers of Zimbabwe
Rowers at the 2016 Summer Olympics